The 1943 Acton by-election was a by-election held on 12 December 1943 for the British House of Commons constituency of Acton in London.

The seat had become vacant after the death in October of the Conservative Member of Parliament (MP) Hubert Duggan.  He had first been elected at the 1931 general election.

During World War II, the major parties had agreed an electoral pact under which they would not contest by-elections in seats held by their respective parties, and as a result many wartime by-elections resulting in a candidate being returned unopposed.  However, other parties and independent politicians were free to field candidates.

Initially there were six candidates but the independent labour and liberal candidates withdrew leaving Walter Padley for the Independent Labour Party (ILP), Edward Godfrey who sought election as an 'English Nationalist' candidate,  Independent Dorothy Crisp who wrote for the Sunday Dispatch and the official Conservative candidate Henry Longhurst.

During the war Walter Padley had been a conscientious objector.  In 1950 he was elected Labour Party MP for Ogmore and served until 1979.

Godfrey was founder of the English National Association, an organisation with alleged Fascist leanings.

The by-election was held on an electoral roll which had not been updated since 1937.

Votes

See also
 List of United Kingdom by-elections

Acton,1943
Acton by-election
Acton,1943
20th century in Middlesex
Acton by-election
Acton, London
Acton by-election